Jozef Stefaan "Jeff", Baron Schell (20 July 1935 – 17 April 2003) was a Belgian molecular biologist.

Schell studied zoology and microbiology at the University of Ghent, Belgium. From 1967  to 1995 he worked as a professor at the university. From 1978 to 2000 he was director and head of the Max Planck Institute for Plant Breeding Research (Institut für Züchtungsforschung)  at the Max-Planck-Gesellschaft in Cologne, Germany. He received many prizes, among which were the Francqui Prize in 1979, the Wolf Prize in Agriculture in 1990, and the Japan Prize in 1998, which he shared with Marc Van Montagu. He also was appointed Professeur Honoraire, Collège de France, Paris in 1998. He was granted the title of Baron by Baudouin of Belgium.

Schell was a pioneer in genetics who focused on the interaction between plants and soil bacteria. Along with his colleague, Marc Van Montagu, Jeff Schell discovered the gene transfer mechanism between Agrobacterium and plants, which resulted in the development of methods to alter Agrobacterium into an efficient delivery system for gene engineering in plants. Besides being a prominent scientist, in 1982 he co-founded, with Marc Van Montagu, the successful biotech company Plant Genetic Systems Inc., now part of Bayer CropScience.

See also
 Walter Fiers
 Mary-Dell Chilton
 Flanders Institute for Biotechnology (VIB)

Selected publications

References

1935 births
2003 deaths
Flemish scientists
Flemish businesspeople
Belgian molecular biologists
Ghent University alumni
Academic staff of Ghent University
History of biotechnology
Australia Prize recipients
Wolf Prize in Agriculture laureates
Foreign associates of the National Academy of Sciences
Members of the Royal Swedish Academy of Sciences
Max Planck Institute directors